A Malthusian growth model, sometimes called a simple exponential growth model, is essentially exponential growth based on the idea of the function being proportional to the speed to which the function grows. The model is named after  Thomas Robert Malthus, who wrote An Essay on the Principle of Population (1798), one of the earliest and most influential books on population.

Malthusian models have the following form:

where

 P0 = P(0) is the initial population size,
 r = the population growth rate, which Ronald Fisher called the Malthusian parameter of population growth in The Genetical Theory of Natural Selection, and Alfred J. Lotka called the intrinsic rate of increase,
 t = time.

The model can also been written in the form of a differential equation:

with initial condition:
P(0)= P0

This model is often referred to as the exponential law. It is widely regarded in the field of population ecology as the first principle of population dynamics, with Malthus as the founder. The exponential law is therefore also sometimes referred to as the Malthusian Law. By now, it is a widely accepted view to analogize Malthusian growth in Ecology to Newton's First Law of uniform motion in physics.

Malthus wrote that all life forms, including humans, have a propensity to exponential population growth when resources are abundant but that actual growth is limited by available resources:

A model of population growth bounded by resource limitations was developed by Pierre Francois Verhulst in 1838, after he had read Malthus' essay. Verhulst named the model a logistic function.

See also
Albert Allen Bartlett – a leading proponent of the Malthusian Growth Model
Exogenous growth model – related growth model from economics
Growth theory – related ideas from economics
Human overpopulation
Irruptive growth – an extension of the Malthusian model accounting for population explosions and crashes
Malthusian catastrophe
Neo-malthusianism
The Genetical Theory of Natural Selection

References

External links
Malthusian Growth Model from Steve McKelvey, Department of Mathematics, Saint Olaf College, Northfield, Minnesota
Logistic Model from Steve McKelvey, Department of Mathematics, Saint Olaf College, Northfield, Minnesota
Laws Of Population Ecology Dr. Paul D. Haemig
On principles, laws and theory of population ecology Professor of Entomology, Alan Berryman, Washington State University
Introduction to Social Macrodynamics Professor Andrey Korotayev
Ecological Orbits Lev Ginzburg, Mark Colyvan

Empirical laws
Mathematical modeling
Population
Population ecology
1798 in economics